The Evangelical-Reformed Church of Uri is a Reformed state cantonal church in the canton of Uri.

History
By the end of 2002, the Uri Church was a member of the Evangelical Reformed Church Association of Central Switzerland . This broke up on 1 January 2003. The newly formed independent Reformed cantonal churches were members of the Federation of Swiss Protestant Churches.

Origins
The presence of Protestants in Uri is closely linked to the construction of the Gotthard railway line in 1882. This led to the influx of many Reformed families of workers and engineers who began to organize Protestant auxiliary associations.

Organization

Parishes
Since its inception the cantonal church comprised three parishes:

Altdorf and surroundings
Erstfeld and Urner Oberland
Ursern with Andermatt, Hospental and Realp and the situated on the top Reusstal Göschenen

In the spring meeting of the Reformed Church on 19 May 2014, a new organizational statute was adopted which provides the fusion of the three traditional parishes into one.

Churches
The church council as the executive of the state church consists of 9 members and is chaired by Dieter Kolthoff (as of 2013). Women ordination is allowed.

External links
The official homepage of the Protestant State Church of Uri (in German)

References 

Reformed cantonal churches in Switzerland
Canton of Uri